Ernst  is both a surname and a given name, the German, Dutch, and Scandinavian form of Ernest. Notable people with the name include:

Surname
 Adolf Ernst (1832–1899) German botanist known by the author abbreviation "Ernst"
 Anton Ernst (1975-) South African Film Producer
 Alice Henson Ernst (1880-1980), American writer and historian
 Britta Ernst (born 1961), German politician
 Cornelia Ernst, German politician
 Edzard Ernst, German-British Professor of Complementary Medicine
 Emil Ernst, astronomer
 Ernie Ernst (1924/25–2013), former District Judge in Walker County, Texas
 Eugen Ernst (1864–1954), German politician 
 Fabian Ernst, German soccer player
 Gustav Ernst, Austrian writer
 Heinrich Wilhelm Ernst, Moravian violinist and composer
 Jim Ernst, Canadian politician
 Jimmy Ernst, American painter, son of Max Ernst
 Joni Ernst, U.S. Senator from Iowa
 K.S. Ernst, American visual poet
 Karl Friedrich Paul Ernst, German writer (1866–1933)
 Ken Ernst, U.S. comics artist
 Klaus Ernst, German politician
 Konstantin Ernst
 Max Ernst, (1891-1976), German artist and painter
 Mensen Ernst (1795–1843), Norwegian road runner and ultramarathonist and one of the first sport professionals
 Morris Ernst, American attorney
 Ole Ernst (1940–2013), Danish actor
 Oswald Herbert Ernst, American general and engineer
 Paul Ernst (American writer), pulp novelist
 Richard R. Ernst  (1933–2021), Swiss chemist
 Sipke Ernst (born 1979), Dutch chess grandmaster
 Susan G. Ernst, American developmental biologist
 Tony Ernst, Swedish journalist
 W. Gary Ernst, American geologist specializing in petrology and geochemistry
 Walter Ernst, German lawyer and Nazi politician
 Wolfgang Ernst, (1956), German lawyer and legal historian

Given name

 Ernst Anders, German painter
 Ernest August (disambiguation), multiple people
 Ernst Balz, German sculptor
 Ernst Stavro Blofeld, evil genius from the James Bond novels and films
 Ernst Boepple (1887–1950), German Nazi official and SS officer executed for war crimes
 Ernst Cassirer, German Jewish philosopher.
 Ernst Chain, German-born British biochemist
 Ernst Cohen, Dutch Jewish chemist known for his work on the allotropy of metals
 Ernst Gebauer, German painter
 Ernst Haeckel, German biologist and illustrator
 Ernst Happel, Austrian football (soccer) manager
 Ernst Reinhold von Hofmann, Russian geologist and mineralogist
 Ernst Jaakson, Estonian diplomat
 Ernst Jansz, Dutch musician and founding member of Doe Maar
 Ernst Jünger (1895-1998), German writer
 Ernst Kaltenbrunner (1903-1946), Austrian-German Nazi SS police chief and war criminal, executed for war crimes
 Ernst Keil (1816-1878), German publisher
 Ernst af Klercker (1881-1955), Swedish general
 Ernst Kummer, German mathematician
 Ernst Laraque, Haitian judoka
 Ernst Larsen, Norwegian athlete
 Ernst Lauda (1859 - 1932), Austrian engineer
 Ernst Lubitsch (1892–1947), German-born Jewish film director
 Ernst Mach, physicist, coined the term "mach number"
 Ernst Mayr, evolutionary biologist, influential in the philosophy of biology
 Ernst Neizvestny, Russian sculptor
 Ernst Öpik, Estonian astronomer
 Ernst Heinrich Roth, (1877–1948), German luthier
 Ernst Röhm, (1887-1934), German military officer and co-founder of the Nazi SA (Stormtroopers)
 Ernst Rolf, Swedish artist
 Ernst Ruska, a German physicist who won the Nobel Prize in Physics in 1986
Ernst "Fritz" Sauckel (1894-1946), German Nazi politician, executed for war crimes
 Ernst Sieber (born 1927), Swiss pastor, social worker, writer, politician and founder of the Sozialwerke Pfarrer Sieber relief organisation
 Ernst Jansen Steur, Dutch notorious former neurologist convicted on over twenty counts of harm
 Ernst Stromer, German palaeontologist
 Ernst Troeltsch, German Protestant theologian
 Ernst Udet, (1896-1941), German flying ace
 Ernst von Hesse-Wartegg, Austrian writer and traveller
 Ernst van de Wetering, Dutch art historian considered to be the world's foremost expert on Rembrandt
 Ernst vom Rath (1909-1938), Nazi German diplomat
 Ernst von der Lancken (1841-1902), Swedish Army major general
 Ernst Zacharias (1924–2020), German musician
 Ernst Zermelo, set theorist
 Ernst Ziegler (1894-1974), German actor
 Ernst Zündel (1939-2017), German neo-Nazi and Holocaust denier
 Count Ernst of Lippe-Biesterfeld, regent of Lippe

See also
 Herzog Ernst, German medieval epic
 Ernst & Young, professional services and accounting firm
 Ernst Home Centers, a defunct hardware chain
 Ernest (disambiguation)

Masculine given names
German-language surnames
German masculine given names
Surnames from given names